Culp Creek is a stream in Lane County, Oregon, in the United States. It was named for John Culp, a pioneer who settled near this stream. The creek flows northeast into the Row River.

See also
Culp Creek, Oregon, an unincorporated community
List of rivers of Oregon

References

Rivers of Lane County, Oregon
Rivers of Oregon